Plantago nubicola is a plant found in Peru, Bolivia, and Argentina.

It was long classified as Bougueria nubicola, the only species in the genus Bougueria, and indeed it has a number of characteristics which make it different from the rest of Plantago.  Nor is its placement in Plantago easy to reconcile with its geographical distribution (in particular, its closest relative appears to be Plantago ovata which is found in the Mediterranean and only recently introduced to North America).  However, molecular data  from several studies places P. nubicola within the genus Plantago.

References

nubicola
Taxa named by Joseph Decaisne